Notozona is a genus of flea beetles belonging to the family Chrysomelidae. The 22 species of this genus are found in Central and Southern America. The genus is closely related to Blepharida.

Selected species
Notozona bifasciata 
Notozona macularia 
Notozona novemmaculata

References

Alticini
Chrysomelidae genera
Taxa named by Louis Alexandre Auguste Chevrolat